The 1975 Toronto Argonauts finished in fourth place in the Eastern Conference with a 5–10–1 record and failed to make the playoffs.

Offseason

Regular season

Standings

Schedule

Awards and honors

References

Toronto Argonauts seasons
1975 Canadian Football League season by team